The Third Taiwan Strait Crisis, also called the 1995–1996 Taiwan Strait Crisis or the 1996 Taiwan Strait Crisis, was the effect of a series of missile tests conducted by the People's Republic of China (PRC) in the waters surrounding Taiwan, including the Taiwan Strait from 21 July 1995 to 23 March 1996. The first set of missiles fired in mid-to-late 1995 were allegedly intended to send a strong signal to the Republic of China government under President Lee Teng-hui, who had been seen as moving its foreign policy away from the One-China policy. The second set of missiles were fired in early 1996, allegedly intending to intimidate the Taiwanese electorate in the run-up to the 1996 presidential election.

Lee's 1995 visit to Cornell

The crisis began when President Lee Teng-hui accepted an invitation from his alma mater, Cornell University to deliver a speech on "Taiwan's Democratization Experience". Seeking to diplomatically isolate the Republic of China, the PRC opposed such visits by ROC (Taiwanese) leaders. A year earlier, in 1994, when President Lee's plane had stopped in Honolulu to refuel after a trip to South America, the U.S. government under President Bill Clinton refused Lee's request for a visa.  Lee had been confined to the military airfield where he landed, forcing him to spend a night on his plane.  A U.S. State Department official called the situation "embarrassing" and Lee complained that he was being treated as a second-class leader.

After Lee had decided to visit Cornell, U.S. Secretary of State Warren Christopher assured PRC Foreign Minister Qian Qichen that a visa for Lee would be "inconsistent with [the U.S.'s] unofficial relationship [with Taiwan]." However, the humiliation from Lee's last visit caught the attention of many pro-Taiwan figures in the U.S. and this time, the United States Congress acted on Lee's behalf.  In May 1995, a concurrent resolution asking the State Department to allow Lee to visit the U.S. passed the House on 2 May with a vote of 396 to 0 (with 38 not voting), and the Senate on 9 May with a vote of 97 to 1 (with 2 not voting).  The State Department relented on 22 May 1995. Lee spent June 9–10, 1995, in the U.S. at a Cornell alumni reunion as the PRC state press branded him a "traitor" attempting to "split China".

PRC military response
The People's Republic of China government under CCP general secretary Jiang Zemin was furious over the U.S.'s policy reversal. On 7 July 1995, PRC responded, the Xinhua News Agency announced missile tests would be conducted by the People's Liberation Army (PLA) and argued that this attitude would endanger the peace and safety of the region (Mainlander refers to it as the fourth Taiwan strait crisis).  At the same time, the PRC mobilized forces in Fujian. In the later part of July and early August, numerous commentaries were published by Xinhua and the People's Daily condemning Lee and his cross-strait policies.

Another set of missile firings, accompanied by live ammunition exercises, occurred from August 15 to 25, 1995. Naval exercises in August were followed by highly publicized amphibious assault exercises in November.

Initial U.S. military response 
The U.S. government responded by staging the biggest display of American military might in Asia since the Vietnam War. In July 1995, USS Belleau Wood (LHA-3) transited the Taiwan Strait, followed by the USS O'Brien (DD-975) and USS McClusky FFG-41 on December 11–12, 1995. Finally on December 19, 1995, the USS Nimitz (CVN-68) and her battle group passed through the straits.

1996 tensions and Taiwan election
Beijing intended to send a message to the Taiwanese electorate that voting for Lee Teng-hui in the 1996 presidential election on March 23 meant war. A third set of PLA tests from March 8 to March 15 (just before the election), sent missiles within  (just inside the ROC's territorial waters) off the ports of Keelung and Kaohsiung. Over 70 percent of commercial shipping passed through the targeted ports, which were disrupted by the proximity of the tests. Flights to Japan and trans-Pacific flights were prolonged by ten minutes because airplanes needed to detour away from the flight path. Ships traveling between Kaohsiung and Hong Kong had to take a two-hour detour. 

On 8 March 1996, also a presidential election year in the U.S., President Clinton announced that the USS Independence CV-62 and her Carrier Battlegroup (Carrier Group Five), returning back to Japan from its visit to the Philippines, to international waters near Taiwan. According to the Washington Post, that same day; the USS Bunker Hill CG-52 (which had detached from the Independence Battlegroup) along with a RC-135 Intelligence aircraft monitored the launch of 3 CSS-6 (DF-15) missiles from the PRC, two of them into shipping lanes near Kaohsiung and one fired directly over Taipei into a shipping lane near Keelung.

On the following day, the PRC announced live-fire exercises to be conducted near Penghu from March 12–20. On March 11, the U.S. dispatched USS Nimitz CVN-68 and her battlegroup, Carrier Group Seven, which steamed at high speed from the Persian Gulf. Tensions rose further on March 15 when Beijing announced a simulated amphibious assault planned for March 18–25. Nimitz and her battle group, along with Belleau Wood, sailed through the Taiwan Strait, while Independence did not.

Aftermath 
Sending two carrier battle groups showed not only a symbolic gesture towards the ROC, but a readiness to fight on the part of the U.S. The ROC government and Democratic Progressive Party welcomed America's support, but staunch unificationist presidential candidate Lin Yang-kang and the PRC decried "foreign intervention."

Aware of U.S. Navy carrier battle groups' credible threat to the PLA Navy, the PRC decided to accelerate its military buildup. Soon the People's Republic ordered s from Russia, a Cold War-era class designed to counter U.S. Navy carrier battle groups, allegedly in mid-December 1996 during the visit to Moscow by Chinese Premier Li Peng. The PRC subsequently ordered modern attack submarines and warplanes (76 Su-30MKK and 24 Su-30MK2) to counter the U.S. Navy's carrier groups.

The PRC's attempts at intimidation were counterproductive.  Arousing more anger than fear, it boosted Lee by 5% in the polls, earning him a majority as opposed to a mere plurality. The military tests and exercises also strengthened the argument for further U.S. arms sales to the ROC and led to the strengthening of military ties between the U.S. and Japan, increasing the role Japan would play in defending Taiwan.

During the military exercises in March, there were preoccupations in Taiwan that the PRC would occupy some small islands controlled by Taiwan, causing panic among many citizens. Therefore, many flights from Taiwan to the United States and Canada were full. The most likely target was Wuqiu (Wuchiu), then garrisoned by 500 soldiers. The outlying islands were placed on high alert. The then secretary general of the National Security Council of Taiwan, Ting Mao-shih, flew to New York to meet Samuel Berger, Deputy National Security Advisor of the United States.

U.S. order of battle (March 1996 – May 1996)

U.S. 7th Fleet 
 Carrier Group 5 - Independence CVBG - (East China Sea)
 USS Independence CV-62 (Forrestal Class Carrier)
 Carrier Air Wing 5 - NF
 VF-154 Black Knights - F-14A Tomcat (TARPS equipped)
 VFA-192 Golden Dragons - F/A-18C Hornet
 VFA-195 Dambusters - F/A-18C Hornet
 VA-115 Eagles - A-6E SWIP Intruder
 VAQ-136 Gauntlets - EA-6B Prowler
 VS-21 Red Tails - S-3B Viking
 VAW-115 Liberty Bells - E-2C Hawkeye
 VQ-5 Sea Shadows Det.A - ES-3A Shadow
 HS-14 Chargers - SH-60F Oceanhawk/HH-60H Rescuehawk
 USS Bunker Hill CG-52 (Ticonderoga Class VLS Cruiser) - (Detached from the Battlegroup southeast of the R.O.C.)
 USS Hewitt DD-966 (Spruance Class VLS Destroyer)
 USS O'Brien DD-975 (Spruance Class VLS Destroyer)
 USS McClusky FFG-41 (Oliver H. Perry Class Frigate)* - After May 10, 1996*
 Carrier Group 7 - Nimitz CVBG - (Taiwan Strait)
 USS Nimitz CVN-68 (Nimitz Class Carrier)
 Carrier Air Wing 9 - NG
 VF-24 Fighting Renegades - F-14A Tomcat
 VF-211 Checkmates - F-14A Tomcat (TARPS equipped)
 VFA-146 Blue Diamonds - F/A-18C (Night Attack) Hornet
 VFA-147 Argonauts - F/A-18C (Night Attack) Hornet
 VA-165 Boomers - A-6E SWIP Intruder
 VAQ-138 Yellow Jackets - EA-6B Prowler
 VS-33 Screwbirds - S-3B Viking
 VAW-112 Golden Hawks - E-2C Hawkeye
 VQ-5 Sea Shadows Det.C - ES-3A Shadow
 HS-8 Eightballers - SH-60F Oceanhawk/HH-60H Rescuehawk
 USS Port Royal CG-73 (Ticonderoga Class VLS Cruiser)
 USS Oldendorf DD-972 (Spruance Class VLS Destroyer)
 USS Callaghan DD-994 (Kidd Class Destroyer)
 USS Ford FFG-54 (Oliver H. Perry Class Frigate)
Belleau Wood SAG - (Taiwan Strait)
USS Belleau Wood LHA-3 (Tarawa Class Amphibious Assault Ship)
31st Marine Expeditionary Unit - EP
VMA-311 Tomcats Det. - AV-8B Harrier II
HMLA Det. - AH-1W Super Cobra/UH-1N Twin Huey
HMH-466 Wolfpack Det. - CH-53E Super Stallion
HMM-265 Dragons  - CH-46E Sea Knight

Subsequent prosecutions
In 1999, Major General Liu Liankun, a top Chinese military logistics officer, and his subordinate Senior Colonel Shao Zhengzhong were arrested, court-martialed and executed for disclosing to Taiwan that the missiles had unarmed warheads despite the Chinese government's claims.

Unofficial forewarning
According to Sankei Shimbun series "Secret Records on Lee Teng-hui" dated April 1, 2019, Tseng Yong-hsien, Lee's National Policy Adviser, received a direct message from China official in early July 1995; "Our ballistic missiles will be launched toward Taiwan a couple of weeks later, but you guys don't have to worry." This was communicated to Lee soon after, to prevent escalation. Tseng, as an envoy of Lee, had met President Yang Shangkun in 1992 and had a secret connection with Ye Xuanning, Head of the Liaison Department of the PLA.

See also
 Political status of Taiwan
 Battle of Guningtou
 First Taiwan Strait Crisis
 Second Taiwan Strait Crisis
 Taiwan Relations Act
 List of battles in Kinmen
 Chinese Civil War
 Liu Liankun
 2022 United States congressional delegation visit to Taiwan
 2022 Chinese military exercises around Taiwan

References

Further reading
 
 
 
 
 
 
 
 
 —This article traces in detail the course of the crisis and analyzes the state of Sino-American relations both before and after the crisis.

External links
The Taiwan Strait Crisis of 1996: Strategic Implications for the United States Navy

Crisis
1995 in China
1995 in Taiwan
1996 in China
1996 in Taiwan
Conflicts in 1995
Conflicts in 1996
Cross-Strait conflict
Naval history of China
Taiwan under Republic of China rule
Military history of Taiwan